"Miss California" is a song by American singer-songwriter Dante Thomas, featuring American rapper and former Fugees member Pras Michel. It was released on February 20, 2001, as the lead single from his debut album, Fly. The track was an international hit, topping the charts of Denmark, Germany, and the Netherlands and becoming a top-five hit in Australia, Austria, New Zealand, Romania, Switzerland, and Wallonia. It also reached number 25 on the UK Singles Chart and number 85 on the US Billboard Hot 100. Cameron Casey directed the song's music video.

Track listings

US CD single
 "Miss California" (radio edit)
 "Miss California" (rap remix)

US maxi-CD single
 "Miss California" (album version)
 "Miss California" (rap remix)
 "Miss California" (Bastone & Bernstein club mix)
 "Miss California" (Bastone & Bernstein Cali dub)
 "Miss California" (radio edit without Pras)
 "Miss California" (original TV track)
 "Miss California" (acapella)

UK and Australian CD single, UK 12-inch single
 "Miss California" (radio version no rap) – 3:28
 "Miss California" (radio version with rap) – 4:08
 "Miss California" (Bastone & Bernstein radio mix) – 3:08
 "Miss California" (Bastone & Bernstein club mix) – 7:44

European CD single
 "Miss California" (radio version with Pras) – 4:08
 "Miss California" (radio version no rap) – 3:28

European cassette single
 "Miss California" (radio version no rap) – 3:28
 "Miss California" (radio version with rap) – 4:08

Charts and certifications

Weekly charts

Year-end charts

Certifications

Release history

References

2001 singles
2001 songs
Dutch Top 40 number-one singles
Elektra Records singles
Number-one singles in Denmark
Number-one singles in Germany
Pras songs
Warner Music Australasia singles